The Higashikuni Cabinet is the 43rd Cabinet of Japan led by Prince Naruhiko Higashikuni from August 17 to October 9, 1945.

Cabinet

References 

Cabinet of Japan
1945 establishments in Japan
Cabinets established in 1945
Cabinets disestablished in 1945